Ptichodis bucetum is a moth of the family Erebidae. It is found in North America, where it has been recorded from Arizona, New Mexico and Utah.

The wingspan is about 30 mm. Adults have been recorded on wing from June to August.

References

Moths described in 1883
Ptichodis
Moths of North America